The Monte Rosa Hut is a mountain hut located near Zermatt on the Monte Rosa massif (up to ) and above the Grenzgletscher (Border Glacier) sitting on a glacier-free rocky part called Untere Plattje at an altitude of . It is owned by the Swiss Alpine Club. The hut is the start of the normal route to the summit and other mountains in the area. A completely new building was inaugurated in 2009, a hi-tech, energy-wise almost self-sufficient, environmentally friendly mountain hut based on wood with an aluminium shell.

Location
The Monte Rosa Hut lies on the western side of Monte Rosa massif, on the place named Untere Plattje. It dominates the Grenzgletscher (Border Glacier) to the south and west, and further down the Gorner Glacier, and is surrounded by many four-thousanders, such as Dufourspitze, Liskamm, Castor, Pollux, Breithorn and Matterhorn.

The hut can be reached using the Gornergratbahn; from the station Rotenboden a trail leads to the Gorner Glacier. Then the Gornergletscher has to be crossed (usually marked itinerary), then over the lower end of the Grenzgletscher, finally at around 2,600 m the trail continues directly to the hut.

History

The first hut from 1895 

The first hut, known under the name Bétemps hut after a family sponsoring the construction, was originally built between 1894 and 1895. It had 25 beds and was owned by the Swiss Alpine Club central committee. The hut was enlarged in 1918 to host 20 more people. The Bétemps hut was offered to the Monte Rosa section in 1929 then transformed and renamed Monte Rosa hut. Between 1939-1940 a new hut with 86 beds was built. The capacity was raised up to 146 in 1972 and 160 in 1984. 

After the new hut was opened in September 2009, the old hut was disassembled for 100,000 Swiss francs and was demolished on 14 July 2011 by a unit of the Swiss Armed Forces using more than 100 kg of military plastic explosive. The demolition was a condition for the allowance to build the new hut close by.

The new hut

A new hi-tech environmentally friendly mountain hut was designed by architect Andrea Deplazes of ETH Zurich and inaugurated in September 2009. The project of the Swiss Alpine Club, to mark the 150th anniversary of ETH Zurich, was launched in 2003. The construction materials prefabricated elements were transported by train to Zermatt and 3,000 helicopter trips were needed to take 35 workers and materials up to the glacier. The five-story polygonal building was built on stainless steel foundations with a spiral interior made out of wood, the exterior being covered with an aluminum shell. The building is designed to obtain 90 percent of its power needs from the sun. Excess energy was originally stored in valve-regulated lead-acid battery cells, which supply power when it is overcast. These batteries were replaced by Lithium-phosphate batteries in 2020. Water is collected from melting glaciers and stored in a large reservoir 40 metres above the hut. Bands of windows allow the sun to heat air inside the spiral building with the redistribution of thermal energy produced by visitors.

Over the next few years the hut will become a research station for the students from the ETH Zurich. They will use it to investigate how to use energy and resources efficiently.

Bibliography
ETH Zurich, ed. (2010) New Monte Rosa Hut SAC. Self-Sufficient Building in the High Alps Zurich, gta, 2010.

References

Futuristic eco-hut opens doors above Zermatt, swissinfo

External links 
Official website (German, French)
Monte Rosa Hut on SummitPost.org

Mountain huts in Switzerland
Monte Rosa
Mountain huts in the Alps